In a decade that broke many traditions, adopted new cultures, and launched a new age of social movements, 1960s fashion had a  nonconformist but stylish, trendy touch. Around the middle of the decade, new styles started to emerge from small villages and cities into urban centers, receiving media publicity, influencing haute couture creations of elite designers and the mass-market clothing manufacturers. Examples include the mini skirt, culottes, go-go boots, and more experimental fashions, less often seen on the street, such as curved PVC dresses and other PVC clothes.

Mary Quant popularized the not mini skirt, and Jackie Kennedy introduced the pillbox hat; both became extremely popular. False eyelashes were worn by women throughout the 1960s. Hairstyles were a variety of lengths and styles. Psychedelic prints, neon colors, and mismatched patterns were in style.

In the early-to-mid 1960s, London "Modernists" known as Mods influenced male fashion in Britain. Designers were producing clothing more suitable for young adults, leading to an increase in interest and sales. In the late 1960s, the hippie movement also exerted a strong influence on women's clothing styles, including bell-bottom jeans, tie-dye and batik fabrics, as well as paisley prints.

Women's fashion

Early 1960s (1960–1962)

High fashion
fashions in the early years of the decade reflected the elegance of the First Lady, Jacqueline Kennedy. In addition to tailored skirts, women wore stiletto heel shoes and suits with short boxy jackets, and oversized buttons. Simple, geometric dresses, known as shifts, were also in style. For evening wear, full-skirted evening dresses were worn; these often had low necklines and close-fitting waists. For casual wear, capri trousers were the fashion for women and girls.

Bikini

The bikini, named after the nuclear test site on Bikini Atoll, was invented in France in 1946 but struggled to gain acceptance in the mass-market during the 1950s, especially in America. The breakthrough came in 1963, after rather large versions featured in the surprise hit teen film Beach Party, culminating with the Beach party film genre.

The rise of trousers for women

The 1960s were an age of fashion innovation for women. The early 1960s gave birth to drainpipe jeans and capri pants, a style popularized by Audrey Hepburn. Casual dress became more unisex and often consisted of plaid button down shirts worn with slim blue jeans, comfortable slacks, or skirts. Traditionally, trousers had been viewed by western society as masculine, but by the early 1960s, it had become acceptable for women to wear them every day. These included Levi Strauss jeans, previously considered blue collar wear, and "stretch" drainpipe jeans with elastane. Women's trousers came in a variety of styles: narrow, wide, below the knee, above the ankle, and eventually mid thigh. Mid-thigh cut trousers, also known as shorts, evolved around 1969. By adapting men's style and wearing trousers, women voiced their equality to men.

Mid 1960s (1963–1966)

Space Age fashions

Space age fashion first appeared in the late 1950s, and developed further in the 1960s. It was heavily influenced by the Space Race of the Cold War, in addition to popular science fiction paperbacks, films and television series such as Star Trek: The Original Series, Dan Dare, or Lost In Space. Designers often emphasized the energy and technology advancements of the Cold War era in their work.

The space age look was defined by boxy shapes, thigh length hemlines and bold accessories. Synthetic material was also popular with space age fashion designers. After the Second World War, fabrics like nylon, corfam, orlon, terylene, lurex and spandex were promoted as cheap, easy to dry, and wrinkle-free. The synthetic fabrics of the 1960s allowed space age fashion designers such as the late Pierre Cardin to design garments with bold shapes and a plastic texture. Non-cloth material, such as polyester and PVC, became popular in clothing and accessories as well. For daytime outerwear, short plastic raincoats, colourful swing coats, bubble dresses, helmet-like hats, and dyed fake-furs were popular for young women. In 1966, the Nehru jacket arrived on the fashion scene, and was worn by both sexes. Suits were very diverse in color but were, for the first time ever, fitted and very slim. Waistlines for women were left unmarked and hemlines were getting shorter and shorter.

Footwear for women included low-heeled sandals and kitten-heeled pumps, as well as the trendy white go-go boots. Shoes, boots, and handbags were often made of patent leather or vinyl. The Beatles wore elastic-sided boots similar to Winkle-pickers with pointed toes and Cuban heels. These were known as "Beatle boots" and were widely copied by young men in Britain.

The French designer André Courrèges was particularly influential in the development of space age fashion. The "space look" he introduced in the spring of 1964 included trouser suits, goggles, box-shaped dresses with high skirts, and go-go boots. Go-go boots eventually became a staple of go-go girl fashion in the 1960s. The boots were defined by their fluorescent colors, shiny material, and sequins.

Other influential space age designers included Pierre Cardin, Paco Rabanne, Rudi Gernreich, Emanuel Ungaro, Jean-Marie Armand, Michèle Rosier, and Diana Dew, though even designers like Yves Saint Laurent showed the look during its peak of influence from 1963 to 1967. Italian-born Pierre Cardin was best known for his helmets, short tunics, and goggles. However, Paco Rabanne has been credited as the one who revolutionized the Space Age fashion. Rabanne was known for his 1966 "12 Unwearable Dresses in Contemporary Materials" collection, made of chain mail, aluminum, and plastic. Rabanne would even design the iconic green dress, as well as the other costumes, Jane Fonda wore in the 1968 science fiction film Barbarella. People Magazine journalist Hedy Philips described Rabanne's Space Age fashion as "turning the fashion world upside down."

A timeless fashion piece: miniskirt

Although designer Mary Quant is credited with introducing the miniskirt in 1964, André Courrèges also claimed credit for inventing the miniskirt. The miniskirt changed fashion forever.

The definition of a miniskirt is a skirt with a hemline around 6, 7 inches above the knees. Early references to the miniskirt from the Wyoming newspaper The Billings Gazette, described the miniskirt as a controversial item that was produced in Mexico City. During the 1950s, the miniskirt began appearing in science fiction films like Flight to Mars and Forbidden Planet

Mary Quant and Andre Courreges both contributed to the invention of the miniskirt during the 1960s. Mary Quant, A British designer, was one of the pioneers of the miniskirt during 1960. She named the skirt after her favorite car, the Mini Cooper. Quant introduced her design in the mid-1960s at her London boutique, Bazaar. She has said: " We wanted to increase the availability of fun for everyone. We felt that expensive things were almost immoral and the New Look was totally irrelevant to us." Miniskirts became popular in London and Paris and the term "Chelsea Look" was coined.

Andre Courreges was a French fashion designer who also began experimenting with hemlines in the early 1960s. He started to show space-age dresses that hit above the knee in late 1964. His designs were more structured and sophisticated than Quant's design. This made the miniskirt more acceptable to the French public. His clothes represented a couture version of the "Youthquake" street style and heralded the arrival of the "moon girl" look.

As teen culture became stronger, the term "Youthquake" came to mean the power of young people. This was unprecedented before the 1960s. Before World War II, teenagers dressed and acted like their parents. Many settled down and began raising families when they were young, normally right after high school. They were often expected to work and assist their families financially. Therefore, youth culture begins to develop only after World War II, when the advancement of many technologies and stricter child labor laws became mainstream. Teenagers during this period had more time to enjoy their youth, and the freedom to create their own culture separate from their parents. Teens soon began establishing their own identities and communities, with their own views and ideas, breaking away from the traditions of their parents. The fabulous "little girl" look was introduced to USA—styling with Bobbie Brooks, bows, patterned knee socks and mini skirts. The miniskirt and the "little girl" look that accompanied it reflect a revolutionary shift in the way people dress. Instead of younger generations dressing like adults, they became inspired by childlike dress.

Second-wave feminism made the miniskirt popular. Women had entered the professional workforce in larger numbers during World War II and many women soon found they craved a career and life outside the home. They wanted the same choices, freedoms, and opportunities that were offered to men.

During the mid-1960s, Mod girls wore very short miniskirts, tall, brightly colored go-go boots, monochromatic geometric print patterns such as houndstooth, and tight fitted, sleeveless tunics. Flared trousers and bell bottoms appeared in 1964 as an alternative to capri pants, and led the way to the hippie period introduced in the 1960s. Bell bottoms were usually worn with chiffon blouses, polo-necked ribbed sweaters or tops that bared the midriff. These were made in a variety of materials including heavy denims, silks, and even elasticated fabrics. Variations of polyester were worn along with acrylics. A popular look for women was the suede mini-skirt worn with a French polo-neck top, square-toed boots, and Newsboy cap or beret. This style was also popular in the early 2000s.

Women were inspired by the top models of those days, such as Twiggy, Jean Shrimpton, Colleen Corby, Penelope Tree, and Veruschka. Velvet mini dresses with lace-collars and matching cuffs, wide tent dresses and culottes pushed aside the geometric shift. False eyelashes were in vogue, as was pale lipstick. Hemlines kept rising, and by 1968 they had reached well above mid-thigh. These were known as "micro-minis". This was when the "angel dress" first made its appearance on the fashion scene. A micro-mini dress with a flared skirt and long, wide trumpet sleeves, it was usually worn with patterned tights, and was often made of crocheted lace, velvet, chiffon or sometimes cotton with a psychedelic print. The cowled-neck "monk dress" was another religion-inspired alternative; the cowl could be pulled up to be worn over the head. For evening wear, skimpy chiffon baby-doll dresses with spaghetti-straps were popular, as well as the "cocktail dress", which was a close-fitting sheath, usually covered in lace with matching long sleeves. Feather boas were occasionally worn. Famous celebrities associated with marketing the miniskirt included: Twiggy; model Jean Shrimpton, who attended an event in the Melbourne Cup Carnival in Australia wearing a miniskirt in 1965; Goldie Hawn, who appeared on Rowan and Martin's Laugh-In with her mini skirt in 1967; and Jackie Kennedy, who wore a short white pleated Valentino dress when she married Aristotle Onassis in 1968.

The Single Girl

Writer, Helen Gurley Brown, wrote Sex and the Single Girl in 1962. This book acted as a guide for women of any marital status to take control of their own lives financially as well as emotionally. This book was revolutionary since it encouraged sex before marriage; something that was historically looked down upon. With the high success of this book, a pathway was set for media to also encourage this behavior. Betty Friedan also wrote The Feminine Mystique the following year, giving insight into the suburban female experience, further igniting women's push for a more independent lifestyle. The second-wave of feminism was getting its start during this period: pushing for a new feminine ideal to be capitalized on.

Fashion photography in the 1960s represented a new feminine ideal for women and young girls: the Single Girl. 1960s photography was in sharp contrast to the models of the 1920s, who were carefully posed for the camera and portrayed as immobile. The Single Girl represented 'movement'. She was young, single, active, and economically self-sufficient. To represent this new Single Girl feminine ideal, many 1960s photographers photographed models outside—often having them walk or run in fashion shoots. Models in the 1960s also promoted sports wear, which reflected the modern fascination with speed and the quickening pace of the 1960s urban life. Although the Single Girl was economically, socially and emotionally self-sufficient, the ideal body form was difficult for many to achieve. Therefore, women were constrained by diet restrictions that seemed to contradict the image of the empowered 1960s Single Girl.

Fashion photographers also photographed the Single Girl wearing business wear, calling her the Working Girl. The Working Girl motif represented another shift for the modern, fashionable woman. Unlike earlier periods, characterized by formal evening gowns and the European look, the 1960s Working Girl popularized day wear and "working clothing". New ready to wear lines replaced individualized formal couture fashion. The Working Girl created an image of a new, independent woman who has control over her body.

There was a new emphasis on ready-to-wear and personal style. As the 1960s was an era of exponential innovation, there was appreciation for something new rather than that of quality. Spending a lot of money on an expensive, designer wardrobe was no longer the ideal and women from various statuses would be found shopping in the same stores.

The Single Girl was the true depiction of the societal and commercial obsession with the adolescent look. Particular to the mid-sixties, icons such as Twiggy popularized the shapeless shift dresses emphasizing an image of innocence as they did not fit to any contours of the human body. The female body has forever been a sign of culturally constructed ideals. The long-limbed and pre-pubescent style of the time depicts how women were able to be more independent, yet paradoxically, also were put into a box of conceived ideals.

Dolly Girl
The "Dolly Girl" was another archetype for young females in the 1960s. She emerged in the mid-1960s, and her defining characteristic is the iconic miniskirt. "Dolly Girls" also sported long hair, slightly teased, of course, and childish-looking clothing. Clothes were worn tight fitting, sometimes even purchased from a children's section. Dresses were often embellished with lace, ribbons, and other frills; the look was topped off with light colored tights. Crocheted clothing also took off within this specific style.

Corsets, seamed tights, and skirts covering the knees were no longer fashionable. The idea of buying urbanized clothing that could be worn with separate pieces was intriguing to women of this era. In the past, one would only buy specific outfits for certain occasions.

Late 1960s (1967–1969)

The hippie subculture
Starting in 1967, youth culture began to change musically and Mod culture shifted to a more laid back hippie or Bohemian style. Hosiery manufacturers of the time like Mary Quant (who founded Pamela Mann Legwear) combined the "Flower Power" style of dress and the Pop Art school of design to create fashion tights that would appeal to a female audience that enjoyed psychedelia.
Ponchos, moccasins, love beads, peace signs, medallion necklaces, chain belts, polka dot-printed fabrics, and long, puffed "bubble" sleeves were popular fashions in the late 1960s. Both men and women wore frayed bell-bottomed jeans, tie-dyed shirts, work shirts, Jesus sandals, and headbands. Women would often go barefoot and some went braless. The idea of multiculturalism also became very popular; a lot of style inspiration was drawn from traditional clothing in Nepal, India, Bali, Morocco and African countries. Because inspiration was being drawn from all over the world, there was increasing separation of style; clothing pieces often had similar elements and created similar silhouettes, but there was no real "uniform".

Fringed buck-skin vests, flowing caftans, the "lounging" or "hostess" pajamas were also popular. "Hostess" pajamas consisted of a tunic top over floor-length culottes, usually made of polyester or chiffon. Long maxi coats, often belted and lined in sheepskin, appeared at the close of the decade. Animal prints were popular for women in the autumn and winter of 1969. Women's shirts often had transparent sleeves. Psychedelic prints, hemp and the look of "Woodstock" emerged during this era.

Indian fashion

In general, urban Indian men imitated Western fashions such as the business suit. This was adapted to India's hot tropical climate as the Nehru suit, a garment often made from khadi that typically had a mandarin collar and patch pockets. From the early 1950s until the mid-1960s, most Indian women maintained traditional dress such as the gagra choli, sari, and churidar. At the same time as the hippies of the late 1960s were imitating Indian fashions, however, some fashion conscious Indian and Ceylonese women began to incorporate modernist Western trends. One particularly infamous fad combined the miniskirt with the traditional sari, prompting a moral panic where conservatives denounced the so-called "hipster sari" as indecent.

Feminist influences
During the late 1960s, there was a backlash by radical feminists in America against accouterments of what they perceived to be enforced femininity within the fashion industry. Instead, these activists wore androgynous and masculine clothing such as jeans, work boots or berets. Black feminists often wore afros in reaction to the hair straighteners associated with middle class white women. At the 1968 feminist Miss America protest, protestors symbolically threw a number of feminine fashion-related products into a "Freedom Trash Can," including false eyelashes, high-heeled shoes, curlers, hairspray, makeup, girdles, corsets, and bras which they termed "instruments of female torture".

Men's fashion

Early 1960s (1960–1962)

Business wear

During the early 1960s, slim fitting single breasted continental style suits and skinny ties were fashionable in the UK and America. These suits, as worn by Sean Connery as James Bond, the Rat Pack's Frank Sinatra, and the cast of Mad Men, were often made from grey flannel, mohair or sharkskin. Tuxedos were cut in a similar form fitting style, with shawl collars and a single button, and were available either in the traditional black, or in bright colors such as red or sky blue popularized by Frankie Valli of The Four Seasons. Men's hats, including the pork pie hat and Irish hat, had narrower brims than the homburgs and fedoras worn in the 1950s and earlier. During the mid-1960s, hats began to decline after presidents John F. Kennedy and Lyndon B. Johnson appeared in public without one.

Ivy League

Ivy League fashion, the precursor to the modern preppy look, was desirable casual wear for middle class adults in America during the early to mid 1960s. Typical outfits included polo shirts, harrington jackets, khaki chino pants, striped T-shirts, Argyle socks, seersucker or houndstooth sportcoats, sweater vests, cardigan sweaters, Nantucket Reds, basketweave loafers, Madras plaid shirts, and narrow brimmed Trilbys sometimes made from straw. The style remained fashionable for men until it was supplanted by more casual everyday clothing influenced by the hippie counterculture during the late 1960s and early 1970s.

Mid 1960s (1963–1966)

Surf fashion

In America and Australia, surf rock went mainstream from 1962 to 1966, resulting in many teenage baby boomers imitating the outfits of groups like The Beach Boys. Pendleton jackets were common due to their cheapness, warmth and durability. Design wise the surf jacket suited popularly with nonchalance, warmth for coastal Californian climate, and utility pockets for surf wax and VW car keys, two surf essentials (Pendleton Woolen Mills).

The Pendleton Surf Jacket expanded upon Fifties pop-cultural fashions, however new in its relaxed, intangibly cool vibe. The surf jacket split from the tough guy rock 'n' roll teen, and mellowing leather's rock attitudes to woolen plaids. Following Rock n Roll's decline were rebels without causes, "Greasers" and "Beats"; dressed down in inappropriate daywear to denounce conformity, Sixties youth, inventors of Surf Fashion, expressed more nomadic and hedonically in this "dress down" style. Surf styles mainstreamed into fashion when Soul Surfers wanted to make livings in surfing-associated careers. They opened businesses that expanded selling surf products into selling surf clothing. These surfer entrepreneurs proliferate surf fashion by mixing their lifestyles into casual wear. As Rock n Roll Beats, and Greaser car clubs used jackets to identify, and as 1950 varsity sports wore lettered cardigans, 1960s Surfies wore surf jackets to identify with surf clubs and as surfers (Retro 1960s Swimwear). Jackets worn as group status identifiers continued in the Sixties, but with focus around beach music and lifestyle.

As surfers banded over localism, plaid and striped surf jackets gained relevancy. Teens wore them to proclaim surf clubs; what beach they were from, and where they surfed. For a surfer though, it is curious why a woolen plaid jacket paired with UGG boots, and not the board-short or aloha shirt identified the surfer. The Pendleton plaid, originally worn by loggers, hunters and fishermen, was a common item of casual wear for American men of all classes before the British invasion. For the youth of the 1960s, however, the plaid Pendleton signified counterculture, and tribal seamen style translated from Welsh folklore, rebellious Scots Highlanders, and rugged American frontiersmen (Bowe).

The Sixties invented the Californian Cool style, by relaxing style to escape Cold War meltdowns with Polynesian fascinations, bridging the macho 1950s teen towards 1960s Hippie style. The Cold War's tense political context conceived Surf Fashion as a way to relax and escape established violence. California, the birthplace of American Surfing, also produced much of the technology experimentations used in the nuclear space race. Caltech designers in Pasadena were designing nuclear arms for day jobs and were surfing at night. The modern surfboard design itself originates from the military-industrial complex's product development, where the Manhattan Project's Hugh Bradner also designed the modern neoprene wetsuit (Inside the Curl).

Californian engineers for the Cold War were also surfing and equally engineering that fashion. Just as the Bikini's name comes from a nuclear test site, Surf fashion in this era consistently references the Cold War context. Surfing became an attractive fashion identity in this era because it perpetuates adolescence, and the pursuit of pleasure in times of anxiety and paranoia. In a teenage-driven culture, which aimed to ignore establishment conflicts, surfers mused Hawaii and its associated tiki culture as a place of escape with tropical paradises as the antithesis to modern society. This sustained Hawaiian flora and fauna patterns' in fashion its attraction. The Sixties Surfer was not the first to escape violence or revolutionize the pursuit of happiness through Polynesian fascination. Accounts of Thomas Jefferson theorize that his exposure to the surfer image in South Pacific travel journals influenced his imagined Pursuit of Happiness (Martin D. Henry). Similarly, Hawaii's surfer image and Californian translation responds to the decade's violence and further inspired full-on nonviolent revolutionary Hippie fashions.

Additionally, as Californian water inspired lifestyles influenced fashion, many guys improvised their own faded jeans using chlorine from backyard swimming pools. Sneakers such as Converse All Stars made the transition from sportswear to streetwear, and guys in California and Hawaii began to grow out their hair.

Mod and British Invasion influences

The leaders of mid-1960s style were the British. The Mods (short for Modernists) adopted new fads that would be imitated by many young people. Mods formed their own way of life creating television shows and magazines that focused directly on the lifestyles of Mods. British rock bands such as The Who, The Small Faces, the Beatles, and The Kinks emerged from the Mod subculture. It was not until 1964, when the Modernists were truly recognized by the public, that women really were accepted in the group. Women had short, clean haircuts and often dressed in similar styles to the male Mods.

The Mods' lifestyle and musical tastes were the exact opposite of their rival group, known as the Rockers. The rockers liked 1950s rock-and roll, wore black leather jackets, greased, pompadour hairstyles, and rode motorbikes. The look of the Mods was classy. They mimicked the clothing and hairstyles of high fashion designers in France and Italy, opting for tailored suits that were topped by parkas. They rode on scooters, usually Vespas or Lambrettas. Mod fashion was often described as the City Gent look. The young men incorporated striped boating blazers and bold prints into their wardrobe. Shirts were slim, with a necessary button down collar accompanied by slim fitted trousers. Levi's were the only type of jeans worn by Modernists.

In the USSR during the mid to late 1960s, Mods and Hippies were nicknamed Hairies for their mop top hair. As with the earlier Stilyagi in the 1950s, young Russian men who dressed this way were ridiculed in the media, and sometimes forced to get their hair cut in police stations.

Late 1960s (1967–1969)

Folk and counterculture influences

The late 1960s to early 1970s witnessed the emergence of the hippie counterculture and freak scene in Britain, Australia, New Zealand and America. Middle class youths of both sexes favored a unisex look with long hair, tie dye and flower power motifs, Bob Dylan caps, kurtas, hemp waistcoats, baja jackets, bell bottoms, sheepskin vests, western shirts and ponchos inspired by acid Westerns, sandals, digger hats, and patches featuring flowers or peace symbols. Jimi Hendrix popularized the wearing of old military dress uniforms as a statement that war was obsolete. Early hippies, derisively referred to as freaks by the older generation, also used elements of roleplay such as headbands, cloaks, frock coats, kaftans, corduroy pants, cowboy boots, and vintage clothing from charity shops, suggesting a romantic historical era, a distant region, or a gathering of characters from a fantasy or science fiction novel.

Peacock Revolution

By 1968, the space age mod fashions had been gradually replaced by Victorian, Edwardian and Belle Époque influenced style, with men wearing double-breasted suits of crushed velvet or striped patterns, brocade waistcoats and shirts with frilled collars. Their hair worn below the collar bone. Rolling Stones guitarist Brian Jones epitomised this "dandified" look. Due to the colorful nature of menswear, the time period was described as the Peacock Revolution, and male trendsetters in Britain and America were called "Dandies," "Dudes," or "Peacocks." From the late 1960s until the mid-1970s Carnaby Street and Chelsea's Kings Road were virtual fashion parades, as mainstream menswear took on psychedelic influences. Business suits were replaced by Bohemian Carnaby Street creations that included corduroy, velvet or brocade double breasted suits, frilly shirts, cravats, wide ties and trouser straps, leather boots, and even collarless Nehru jackets. The slim neckties of the early 1960s were replaced with Kipper ties exceeding five inches in width, and featuring crazy prints, stripes and patterns.

Hairstyles of the 1960s

Women's hairstyles

Women's hair styles ranged from beehive hairdos in the early part of the decade to the very short styles popularized by Twiggy and Mia Farrow just five years later to a very long straight style as popularized by the hippies in the late 1960s. Between these extremes, the chin-length contour cut and the pageboy were also popular. The pillbox hat was fashionable, due almost entirely to the influence of Jacqueline Kennedy, who was a style-setter throughout the decade. Her bouffant hairstyle, described as a "grown-up exaggeration of little girls' hair", was created by Kenneth.

During the mid and late 1960s, women's hair styles became very big and used a large quantity of hair spray, as worn in real life by Ronnie Spector and parodied in the musical Hairspray. Wigs became fashionable and were often worn to add style and height. The most important change in hairstyles at this time was that men and women wore androgynous styles that resembled each other. In the UK, it was the new fashion for mod women to cut their hair short and close to their heads. Meanwhile, hippie girls favored long, straight natural hair, kept in place with a bandana.

Men's hairstyles

For professional men born before 1940, the side parted short back and sides was the norm in the UK, Europe and America from the early 60s until the end of the decade. Black men usually buzzed their hair short or wore styles like the conk, artificially straightened with chemicals. Blue collar white men, especially former military personnel, often wore buzzcuts and flat tops during the summer. During the early to mid 60s, rebellious Irish-American, Italian-American and Hispanic teens influenced by the greaser subculture often wore ducktails, pompadours and quiffs.

Due to the influence of mod bands like the Beatles or the Rolling Stones, mop-top hairstyles were most popular for white and Hispanic men during the mid 60s. The mod haircut began as a short version around 1963 through 1964, developed into a longer style worn during 1965–66, and eventually evolved into an unkempt hippie version worn during the 1967–1969 period and into the early 1970s. Facial hair, evolving in its extremity from simply having longer sideburns, to mustaches and goatees, to full-grown beards became popular with young men from 1966 onwards.

Head coverings changed dramatically towards the end of the decade as men's hats went out of style, replaced by the bandanna, digger hat, Stetson, or Bob Dylan cap if anything at all. As men let their hair grow long, the Afro became the hairstyle of choice for African Americans. This afro was not just a fashion statement but also an emblem of racial pride. They started to believe that by allowing their hair to grow in its nature state without chemical treatments, they would be accepting their racial identities.

Image gallery
A selection of images representing the fashion trends of the 1960s:

See also

Fashion designers

 Barbara Hulanicki
 Rudi Gernreich
 Bill Gibb
 Guy Laroche
 Emilio Pucci
 Jean Muir
 Mary Quant
 Paco Rabanne
 Oscar de la Renta
 Yves Saint-Laurent (designer)
 Mila Schön

Style icons

 Marella Agnelli
 Anouk Aimée
 Brigitte Bardot
 Jane Birkin
 Amanda Burden
 Pattie Boyd
 Claudia Cardinale
 Cher
 Consuelo Crespi
 Julie Christie
 Catherine Deneuve
 Farah Diba
 Faye Dunaway
 Jane Fonda
 Dolores Guinness
 Gloria Guinness
 Audrey Hepburn
 Jacqueline Kennedy
 Sophia Loren
 Babe Paley
 Hope Portocarrero
 Lee Radziwill
 Vanessa Redgrave
 Jacqueline de Ribes
 Diana Ross
 Diana Rigg
 Edie Sedgwick
 Nancy Sinatra
 Queen Sirikit
 Sharon Tate
 Raquel Welch
 Steve Winwood
 Natalie Wood
 Stevie Wright
 Jayne Wrightsman
 Harry Vanda
Gloria Vanderbilt

Supermodels

 Marisa Berenson
Pattie Boyd
 Capucine
 Colleen Corby
 Cathee Dahmen
 Celia Hammond
 Lauren Hutton
 Donyale Luna
 Nico
 Jean Shrimpton
 Penelope Tree
 Twiggy
 Veruschka
 Agneta Frieberg

Fashion photographers

 Richard Avedon
 David Bailey
 Cecil Beaton
 Hiro (photographer)
 William Klein
 Patrick Lichfield
 Terry O'Neill
 Norman Parkinson
 Lord Snowdon
 Bert Stern

Teenage subcultures
 Greaser subculture
 Rocker subculture
 Raggare
 Bodgies
 Mod subculture
 Soc subculture
 Youthquake
 Surfer
 Beatnik
 Hippie
 Rude Boy
 Skinhead
 Black Panthers

Other

 Carnaby Street
 Miniskirt
 Swinging London
 Twiggy
 Vogue
 Diana Vreeland

References

External links

 
 
 
 
 Everyday Life in the 1960's - Expired Knowledge

Hippie movement
1960s fashion
1960s decade overviews